Two antipopes used the regnal name Victor IV:

 Antipope Victor IV (1138)
 Antipope Victor IV (1159–1164) (1095–1164)